Pat Cash and Mark Woodforde defeated the defending champions Jeremy Bates and Anders Järryd in the final, 6–2, 7–6(7–5) to win the senior gentlemen's invitation doubles tennis title at the 2010 Wimbledon Championships.

Draw

Final

Group A
Standings are determined by: 1. number of wins; 2. number of matches; 3. in two-players-ties, head-to-head records; 4. in three-players-ties, percentage of sets won, or of games won; 5. steering-committee decision.

Group B
Standings are determined by: 1. number of wins; 2. number of matches; 3. in two-players-ties, head-to-head records; 4. in three-players-ties, percentage of sets won, or of games won; 5. steering-committee decision.

External links
 Draw

Men's Invitation Doubles, Senior